Drap is a commune in the Alpes-Maritimes department in the Provence-Alpes-Côte d'Azur region of Southeastern France.

Population
The inhabitants are called Drapois and Drapoises.

See also
Communes of the Alpes-Maritimes department

References

Communes of Alpes-Maritimes